"Surely You're Joking, Mr. Feynman!": Adventures of a Curious Character is an edited collection of reminiscences by the Nobel Prize–winning physicist Richard Feynman.  The book, released in 1985, covers a variety of instances in Feynman's life. The anecdotes in the book are based on recorded audio conversations that Feynman had with his close friend and drumming partner Ralph Leighton.

Summary
The book has many stories which are lighthearted in tone, such as his fascination with safe-cracking, studying various languages, participating with groups of people who share different interests (such as biology or philosophy), and ventures into art and samba music. 

Other stories cover more serious material, including his work on the Manhattan Project (during which his first wife Arline Greenbaum died of tuberculosis) and his critique of the science education system in Brazil. The section "Monster Minds" describes his slightly nervous presentation of his graduate work on the Wheeler–Feynman absorber theory in front of Albert Einstein, Wolfgang Pauli, Henry Norris Russell, John von Neumann, and other major scientists of the time.

The anecdotes were edited from taped conversations that Feynman had with his close friend and drumming partner Ralph Leighton.  Its surprise success led to a sequel, What Do You Care What Other People Think?, also taken from Leighton's taped conversations. Surely You're Joking, Mr. Feynman! became a national bestseller.

The closing chapter, "Cargo Cult Science," is adapted from the address that Feynman gave during the 1974 commencement exercises at the California Institute of Technology.

The book's title is taken from a comment made by a woman at Princeton University after Feynman asked for both cream and lemon in his tea, not being familiar with the proper etiquette.

Criticism

Murray Gell-Mann was upset by Feynman's account in the book of the weak interaction work, and threatened to sue, resulting in a correction being inserted in later editions.

Feynman was criticized for a chapter titled "You Just Ask Them?" where he recounts picking up a woman by deliberately insulting her with a misogynistic term after the woman seemingly plays him for free food. Feynman states at the end of the chapter that this behavior was not typical.

Publication data
 Surely You're Joking, Mr. Feynman!: Adventures of a Curious Character, Richard Feynman, Ralph Leighton (contributor), Edward Hutchings (editor), 1985, W. W. Norton, 1997 paperback: , 2002 Blackstone Audiobooks unabridged audio cassette:

See also
 Cargo cult science

References

External links 
 

1985 books
American autobiographies
Books about scientists
W. W. Norton & Company books
Works by Richard Feynman